Anjum Fakih (born 12 September 1989) is an Indian actress and model. She is best known for her work in Zee TV popular shows Ek Tha Raja Ek Thi Rani and Kundali Bhagya. In a short span of time, she has established herself as one of the promising new actresses on Indian television.

Early life
Anjum Fakih was born on 12 September 1989 in Ratnagiri, Maharashtra, India in a Konkani Muslim family. Her parents Kamaluddin Fakih and Sultana Fakih live in Vikhroli and Panderi, Ratnagiri. She completed her education from University of Mumbai. At the age of 19 she left her home to pursue a career in acting and modeling and relocated herself to Mumbai. Later she enrolled herself in Elan Modelling Agency Pvt Ltd. where she started her career as a model. Later she has appeared in several commercials.

Career

Fakih decided to become a model when she was just 19 years old.

In 2010, she ventured into Hindi television with an unnoticed part of Bonita Ahluwalia in rom-com Mahi Way.

Post a five years hiatus, she returned to television in 2015 with Star Plus's romantic drama Tere Sheher Mein which featured her as Rachita Agnihotri. In the same year, she also appeared in Time Machine. Later that year in December, Fakih starred as the evil antagonist Rani Rageshwari in Ek Tha Raja Ek Thi Rani, a period drama broadcast on Zee TV, and was highly appreciated for her acting skills before she left the show in 2016.

In February 2017, she signed Colors TV's social drama Devanshi. It saw her portray Sakshi, the adoptive sister of main titular character Devanshi (played by Helly Shah).

Since July 2017, Fakih appears as a parallel lead in Zee TV popular television show Kundali Bhagya which is backed by Ekta Kapoor. Her performance as the naughty and fun-loving Srishti won her a Gold Award and Zee Rishtey Award. Apart from being the biggest weekday launch in terms of TRP since 2016, Kundali Bhagya is currently Zee TV's most watched soap on TV.

In 2018 and 2020, she also did a cameo in Ekta Kapoor's other productions Dil Hi Toh Hai (on Sony TV) and Naagin 5 (on Colors TV) respectively.

In 2020, Fakih was seen playing key roles in two web shows Kashmakash and Kehne Ko Humsafar Hain. In December 2020, she made her music video debut with Ik Dafa Toh Mil.

Since August 2021, Fakih is seen as Maitri in Bade Achhe Lagte Hain 2.

Filmography

Television

Special appearances

Music videos

Web series

References

External links

 
 

Living people
1989 births
People from Ratnagiri
Actresses from Maharashtra
Indian television actresses
Indian web series actresses
Actresses in Hindi television
Female models from Maharashtra
University of Mumbai alumni
Indian expatriates in Saudi Arabia
21st-century Indian actresses